Santa Teresita Airport  is a public use airport serving Santa Teresita in the Santa Cruz Department of Bolivia. Santa Teresita is a border crossing point with Brazil.

See also

Transport in Bolivia
List of airports in Bolivia

References

External links 
OpenStreetMap - Santa Teresita

Fallingrain - Santa Teresita Airport

Airports in Santa Cruz Department (Bolivia)